Birchim is an unincorporated community in Galena Township, LaPorte County, Indiana.

History
The community's name likely honors Abraham Birchem, a pioneer settler, although the spelling is different.

Geography

References

Unincorporated communities in LaPorte County, Indiana
Unincorporated communities in Indiana